Aiglun is a commune in the Alpes-Maritimes department in the Provence-Alpes-Côte d'Azur region of southeastern France.

The inhabitants of the commune are known as Aiglenois or Aiglenoises.

Geography
Aiglun is a remote mountain commune some 40 km north-east of Nice in a straight line. There are only two access routes to the commune - the first by Highway D17 from Roquesteron to the east.  Heading west on Highway D17 continue left onto Highway D10 which continues via a mountainous route into the commune and the village of Aiglun. The other access is the continuation of Highway D10 west from Aiglun over a circuitous mountain route to Le Mas.  The Estéron river passes through the commune south of the village and forms part of the western border of the commune as well as a small portion of the eastern border. Numerous streams feed into this river in the commune.

The northern part of the commune consists of high snow-capped mountains while the southern part is less high mountains. There are few roads however there are four hamlets in the Esteron Valley: Vascogne, Les Lones, Le Colombier, and L'Escle.

Neighbouring communes and villages

History
In 1388 the village of Aiglun was under the protection of the House of Savoy like the rest of the region during the "Dédition of Nice to Savoy" from 1388.

At the Treaty of Turin on 24 March 1760, the commune became French (the kingdom of France and that of Sardinia then proceeded to boundary adjustments and therefore there was an exchange of territories).

Toponymy
The name of the town appears for the first time in texts around 1200 in the form Ayglezuni. This was derived from the Latin word Aquila, meaning "eagle", and the Gallic dunum, meaning "height" and signifies as a whole the "height of the eagle".

Heraldry

Administration

List of Successive Mayors of Aiglun

Mayors from 1942

Population

Sites and Monuments
The village is known for its steep climbing walls over 200 metres high with high difficulty routes.  The Aiglun canyon is also popular for canyoning enthusiasts.

Aiglun Picture Gallery

Notable people
Fanny Robiane. Daughter of Joseph Robin, who was mayor of Aiglun in the early 20th century, this French theatre actress died in 1982 at Aiglun, where she retired and she has left a rich archive (autographed books, including by Armand Godoy, Jean-Richard Bloch and others; pictures; clippings, etc.). Her memory is still alive with the people of Aiglun (the Aiglenois) who knew her and plans are underway to honour her. A cultural association sponsored among others by the commune and the General Council launched since 2004 called "Fanny Robiane Encounter" devoted to theatre, poetry, music and other one-time cultural events are scheduled throughout the year. Sometimes these events are carried out in collaboration with the University of Nice.

See also
 Communes of the Alpes-Maritimes department
Yves Bernard, The Tourist and Cultural Directory of the Alpes-Maritimes and Monaco, p. 149 Publishing Campanile, 1997

References

External links

Official website for Aiglun 
Aiglun on the old IGN website 
Aiglun on Géoportail, National Geographic Institute (IGN) website 
Aiglun on the 1750 Cassini Map

Communes of Alpes-Maritimes